Myint Naing is a Burmese politician.

Myint Naing may also refer to:

Htun Myint Naing,  Burmese businessman
Myint Naing (artist) (born 1967),  Myanmar watercolour artist
Myint Naing (professor) (born 1942),  Burmese dental professor
Myint Naing (MP) (born 1968), Burmese politician